Albert Simonyan (born December 5, 1962), better known by his stage name Tata, is an Armenian singer-songwriter widely known among the Armenian diaspora. Simonyan received the title of the Honored Artist of Armenia in 2006, and was nominated for "King of Pop" in Moscow in 2008. To date, Tata has put on performances to audiences in the U.S., Canada, Australia, the Netherlands, Belgium, the United Kingdom, France, Spain, Greece, the Middle East and 45 cities in Russia. Tata has also played in several films. Currently, Tata is residing in Los Angeles, California.

Biography
Tata was born in 1962 in Yerevan, the capital of Armenia. In 1977, he graduated from Yerevan V. Terian Secondary School N 60. During the school years, he studied in the accordion department of the music school. Tata started his career in 1980 with the "Cilicia" ensemble. In 1991 he recorded his first album, Yerekon Idjav. He participated in the "Yerevan-Moscow Transit" project, where he performed with the Russian bands "Otpetie Moshenniki" and "Reflex". In 2006 he was awarded the title of Honored Artist of the Republic of Armenia. In 2008 his "Tata" production center together with Armenia TV company implemented the "National Star" project, the artistic director of which was Tata Simonyan. He has released eight albums for which he wrote the music and lyrics. Tata recorded duets with Lyubov Uspenskaya, Anatoly Dneprov, Kristina Orbakaite, and Eva Rivas.
From November 2012 to April 2013, he was the coach of the Voice of Armenia project.

Discography

Studio albums
Yerekon Idjav (1991)
Tata & Asbarez (1997)
Te ach, te dzakh (1998)
Ov e na (1999)
Shaba-daba-dash (2001)
Andzrev e yekel (2003)
Tevavor qaminer (2006)
Amenalave du es (2009)

Live albums
The Best of Tata: Live in Concert (1999)
10 Tari Anc (2008)
Tata Simonyan’s Star Friends (2009)
Live Concert in Moscow (2014)

Filmography
1996 - Our Yard
1998 - Our Yard 2
2005 - Our Yard 3
2009 - Star of Love

Awards and achievements 
Here is chronologically the awards Simonyan has received so far.

References

20th-century Armenian male singers
1962 births
Musicians from Yerevan
Living people
Armenian pop singers
Honored artists of Armenia
21st-century Armenian male singers